The Wizard of Gore is a 2007 splatter/noir horror film directed by Jeremy Kasten and starring Kip Pardue, Bijou Phillips, Crispin Glover, Joshua Miller, Brad Dourif, Jeffrey Combs, and the Suicide Girls. The film is a remake of the 1970 Herschell Gordon Lewis film of the same name.

Plot

A magician named Montag the Magnificent puts on elaborate magic shows in a dilapidated post-punk Los Angeles in which he seemingly kills, in brutal torturous fashions, beautiful young women who nevertheless appear alive and unharmed at the end of the trick. Later, however, the victims are found dead of the same wounds that Montag gave them. Ed Bigelow, a young journalist with a trust fund and vintage style, tries to solve the mystery, but ends up discovering that he may be more involved than he first thought.

Cast
 Kip Pardue as Edmund "Ed" Bigelow
 Bijou Phillips as Maggie
 Crispin Glover as Montag the Magnificent
 Joshua Miller as Jinky
 Brad Dourif as Dr. Chong
 Jeffrey Combs as The Geek
 Garz Chan as Annie
 Tim Chiou as Chinese Mickey
 Evan Seinfeld as Frank
 Suicide Girls as Dell, Cecelia, Cayenne, and Rexina
 Kenneth Moskow as Det. Packard

Production
The Wizard of Gore was filmed in Los Angeles and director Kasten refers to it as "love letter" to Downtown L.A.

Release

Reception

References

External links
 
 
 
 Fatally Yours interview with director Jeremy Kasten

2007 films
2007 horror films
American mystery films
Remakes of American films
Horror film remakes
Films about magic and magicians
Films set in Los Angeles
Films shot in Los Angeles
2007 independent films
American neo-noir films
American splatter films
American independent films
2000s English-language films
Films directed by Jeremy Kasten
Films scored by Steve Porcaro
2000s American films